The men's 10,000 metres event at the 2022 African Championships in Athletics was held on 8 August in Port Louis, Mauritius.

Results

References

2022 African Championships in Athletics
10,000 metres at the African Championships in Athletics